Man in a Landscape was a Canadian cultural documentary television series which aired on CBC Television in 1963.

Premise
This series featured various programs ostensibly relating to the arts.

Scheduling
This half-hour series aired on Wednesdays at 10:30 p.m. (Eastern) from 17 July to 18 September 1963.

A feature based on Lister Sinclair's poem on Beethoven was planned as the series debut, but was unexpectedly pre-empted. This episode aired later, outside the series regular time slot, on 14 September 1963. It featured Douglas Rain portraying Beethoven and Frank Perry portraying other characters. James Murray produced this programme.

Episodes
 "Chopin's Life in Paris", a two-part biography (Ronald Hambleton producer), broadcast 17 and 24 July 1963
 "Wall and Window", a two-part documentary on architecture, hosted by University of Toronto professor James Acland, which was broadcast 31 July and 7 August 1963
 A six-part series on travel history hosted by Anna Camerson (Leo Rampen producer), broadcast 14 August to 18 September 1963

References

External links
 

CBC Television original programming
1963 Canadian television series debuts
1963 Canadian television series endings